Bernard Francis Saul II (born 1931/32) is an American billionaire heir and businessman. He is the chairman and chief executive officer (CEO) of Saul Centers, private real estate firm based in Bethesda, Maryland, since 1993.

Early life
Saul is the grandson of the company's founder, Bernard Francis Saul. He has a bachelor's degree from Villanova University, and an LLB from the University of Virginia School of Law.

Career
Saul has been the chairman and chief executive officer of Saul Centers, a private real estate firm based in Bethesda, Maryland, since June 1993.

In August 2018, according to Forbes, Saul's net worth was $3.8 billion.

Philanthropy
Saul is a strong supporter of Roman Catholic causes; in 1991, the pope awarded him the Pro Ecclesia et Pontifice medal.

Personal life
Saul is married, with five children, and lives in Chevy Chase, Maryland, U.S. His son, B. Francis Saul III, is a member the board of trustees at the Center for the Study of the Presidency and Congress, a non-partisan policy think tank in Washington, DC.

References

1930s births
Living people
Year of birth missing (living people)
Place of birth missing (living people)
Villanova University alumni
University of Virginia School of Law alumni
American chief executives
American billionaires
American Roman Catholics
Bernard